The "Cranken Rhyme" is a Cornish-language song known by farmer John Davey or Davy (1812–1891), who was one of the last people with some knowledge of the tongue. It was recorded by J. Hobson Matthews in his History of St. Ives, Lelant, Towednack, and Zennor, and is probably the latest known traditional Cornish verse.

Matthews records the song in a chapter on the Cornish language and the evidence for its late survival. It is not clear whether he ever met Davey, or if he was relying on second-hand testimony. Either way, the song is unknown from any other source, demonstrating that Davey had knowledge of some original Cornish in the late 19th century. Matthews himself thought the song to be merely a jumble of place-names, which Davey was reputed to be able to decipher. However, Robert Morton Nance respelled the song into a recognizable form and provided an English translation. It is evidently a bit of humour claiming that even the Penzance-Marazion road was more fertile than Cranken's stony fields.

References

Cornish-language literature
English poetry